Rhondda East was a parliamentary constituency which returned one Member of Parliament (MP) to the House of Commons of the Parliament of the United Kingdom from 1918 until 1974. Along with Rhondda West it was formed by dividing the old Rhondda constituency.

History 
Rhondda East was for a time a heartland of the Communist Party of Great Britain, who formed the main opposition on the council.  For a time, Annie Powell was the only Communist mayor in Britain.  Harry Pollitt, General Secretary of the CPGB, narrowly failed to win the seat in 1945.

Boundaries 
1918–1949: The Urban District of Rhondda seventh, eighth, ninth, and tenth wards, and part of the sixth.

1950–1974: The Urban District of Rhondda seventh, eighth, ninth, tenth, and eleventh wards, and part of the sixth.

Members of Parliament

Election results

Elections in the 1910s

Elections in the 1920s

{{Election box winning candidate with party link|
  |party      = Labour Party (UK)
  |candidate  = David Watts-Morgan
  |votes      = 17,146
  |percentage = 55.0
  |change     = N/A}}

Elections in the 1930s

Elections in the 1940s

Elections in the 1950s

Elections in the 1960s

Elections in the 1970s

 See also 
 1933 Rhondda East by-election

References

Sources

http://www.psr.keele.ac.uk/ (Election results from 1951 to the present)
F. W. S. Craig, British Parliamentary Election Results 1918 - 1949F. W. S. Craig, British Parliamentary Election Results 1950 - 1970''

History of Glamorgan
Historic parliamentary constituencies in South Wales
Constituencies of the Parliament of the United Kingdom established in 1918
Constituencies of the Parliament of the United Kingdom disestablished in 1974
Politics of Rhondda Cynon Taf